Nariman Shavkatovich Miftyayev (born 26 January 1991) is a former Russian professional football player.

Club career
He made his Russian Football National League debut for FC Neftekhimik Nizhnekamsk on 7 July 2013 in a game against FC Angusht Nazran.

External links
 
 Career summary by sportbox.ru
 

1991 births
Living people
Russian footballers
Association football defenders
FC Neftekhimik Nizhnekamsk players